Zanzibar West District is one of the two districts of the Zanzibar Urban/West Region of Tanzania.  It is bordered to the north by the Zanzibar North Region, to the east by the Zanzibar Central/South Region, to the south by Kiwani Bay, and to the west by the Zanzibar Urban District.

 Census, the population of the Zanzibar West District was 184,204, but by the 2012 Census it had more than doubled to 370,645

Administrative subdivisions

Constituencies
For parliamentary elections, Tanzania is divided into constituencies. As of the 2010 elections the area for Zanzibar West District had nine of the nineteen constituencies in the region:
 Bububu Constituency
 Dimani Constituency
 Dole Constituency
 Fuoni Constituency
 Kiembesamaki Constituency
 Magogoni Constituency
 Mfenesini Constituency
 Mtoni Constituency
 Mwanakwerekwe Constituency

Wards
, the Zanzibar West District was administratively divided into thirty-nine wards:

Notes

Districts of Mjini Magharibi Region